Aidan Nugent is a Gaelic footballer who plays at senior level for the Armagh county team. He is the Armagh joint captain in 2022.

He scored a goal in the 2022 All-Ireland quarter-final between Armagh and Galway at Croke Park. Along with Galway captain Seán Kelly he was controversially issued a straight red card following a brawl before extra-time.

References

Year of birth missing (living people)
Living people
Armagh inter-county Gaelic footballers